Apomys, commonly known as earthworm mice, is a genus of rodent endemic to the Philippines.  Mice belonging to this genus are generally called Philippine forest mice and can be found on most islands of the Philippines except in Palawan, the Sulu Archipelago, and the Batanes and Babuyan group of islands.

Apomys mice weigh from 18g to 128g. The tail is longer or nearly equal the length of the head and body.  The soft and thick fur of these mice is darker on the back while the front fur is paler, often nearly white with a moderate orange yellow wash. The hind feet are moderately long and narrow, have six plantar pads, and have digits 2–4 notably longer than digit 5 and the hallux. All species have two pairs of inguinal mammae.

Species

Nineteen species are known in two subgenera:
Subgenus Apomys - smaller, arboreal species
Camiguin forest mouse, A. camiguinensis Heaney & Tabaranza, 2006
Mount Apo forest mouse, A. hylocoetes Mearns, 1905
Mindanao montane forest mouse, A. insignis Mearns, 1905
Mindanao lowland forest mouse, A. littoralis Sanborn, 1952
Small Luzon forest mouse, A. microdon Hollister, 1913
Least forest mouse, A. musculus Miller, 1911
Subgenus Megapomys - larger, ground-living species
Luzon Cordillera forest mouse, A. abrae Sanborn, 1952
Luzon Aurora forest mouse, A. aurorae Heaney, Balete, Alviola, Duya, Veluz, VandeVrede & Steppan, 2011
Mount Banahaw forest mouse, A. banahao Heaney, Balete, Alviola, Duya, Veluz, VandeVrede & Steppan, 2011
Mount Tapulao forest mouse, A. brownorum Heaney, Balete, Alviola, Duya, Veluz, VandeVrede & Steppan, 2011
Luzon montane forest mouse, A. datae Meyer, 1899
Large Mindoro forest mouse, A. gracilirostris Ruedas, 1995
Mount Irid forest mouse, A. iridensis Heaney, Balete, Veluz, Steppan, Esseltyn, Pfeiffer & Rickart, 2014
Lubang forest mouse, A. lubangensis Heaney, Balete, Veluz, Steppan, Esseltyn, Pfeiffer & Rickart, 2014
Luzon giant forest mouse, A. magnus Heaney, Balete, Alviola, Duya, Veluz, VandeVrede & Steppan, 2011
Mount Mingan forest mouse, A. minganensis Heaney, Balete, Alviola, Duya, Veluz, VandeVrede & Steppan, 2011
Long-nosed Luzon forest mouse, A. sacobianus Johnson, 1962
Sierra Madre forest mouse, A. sierrae Heaney, Balete, Alviola, Duya, Veluz, VandeVrede & Steppan, 2011
Luzon Zambales forest mouse, A. zambalensis Heaney, Balete, Alviola, Duya, Veluz, VandeVrede & Steppan, 2011

Several species also awaits formal description.

The species generally inhabit narrow ecological niches with small endemic ranges.

See also
Cloud rat

References

 
Rodents of the Philippines
Rodent genera
Taxa named by Edgar Alexander Mearns